Thyas javanica is a species of moth of the  family Erebidae. It is found on Sumatra, Java, Bali, the Peninsular Malaysia and Borneo.

Subspecies
Thyas javanica javanica
Thyas javanica defasciata (Borneo)

External links
 Species info

Ophiusina
Moths described in 1917